Clathrus crispatus is a species of fungus in the stinkhorn family. It is found in Asia.

References

Phallales
Fungi of Asia